Yazoo City station is an Amtrak intercity train station in Yazoo City, Mississippi, United States. The station is unstaffed and requires notification in advance for the train to stop, because it is listed as a flag stop in the Amtrak timetable.

References

External links 

Yazoo City Amtrak Station (USA Rail Guide -- Train Web)

Amtrak stations in Mississippi
Buildings and structures in Yazoo County, Mississippi